Tort law in Australia is substantively similar to that of other common law jurisdictions, especially at a foundational level. This is due to the legal system of Australia having been derived from the UK, like most other common law nations around the globe.

There are a large number of torts that exist at Australian law. Generally, the most commonly litigated torts in Australia are those of negligence, trespass, and defamation.

Overview

Prior to the abolition of appeals to the Privy Council for Australian disputes, tort jurisprudence in Australia largely complied with UK precedent.

Since the independence of Australia's legal system, its jurisprudence has diverged from the UK and other common law countries in various respects. Jurisprudence development of tort in Australia largely is driven by the High Court of Australia. 

Tort decisions in other jurisdictions continue to have influence on Australia's courts, and are commonly referred to for comparative law purposes. The High Court has stated that it is 'inevitable and desirable that the courts of this country will continue to obtain assistance and guidance from the learning and reasoning of other great common law courts'.

To the extent tort is a creature of the common law, Australia's tort regime is nationally unified. This is due to the High Court's position in Lipohar, that there is only one common law in Australia.

Despite this, Tort law in Australia is not uniform. Australia's State parliaments are able to modulate tort law within their own jurisdictions through statute, and the Australian Parliament usually lacks the legislative authority to override them, excepting when it rely upon a s51 head of power to do so. Nevertheless, the States have independently on occasion attempted to unify their tort systems to various degrees.

Difference in Australian Tort law 
As Australia's jurisprudence has diverged, so too has its court's emphasis and approach to all aspects of the tort legal process. Differences have emerged in its tests for causation, the finding of a duty of care, and in the calculation of damages. These nuances have been documented in detail by Australian academics; they are complex and are numerous.

Some of the most notable differences compared to other jurisdictions are the 'salient features' framework used to determine a duty of care for neglitence, as well as the fact that intent is not an element for trespass in Australia.

List of torts Australian law 
(See: List of torts in Australian jurisprudence)
Breach of public and statutory duties
 Public nuisance
 Breach of statutory duties
 Interferences with the judicial process
Defamation (See: Defamation in Australia)
Interference with employment and family relations
 Actions per quod servitium amisit (injuring an employee rendering them unable to perform services for their employer)
Loss of consortium of a spouse (abolished in New South Wales, Tasmania, Western Australia, and the Australian Capital Territory.
Intentional damage to economic interests
 Interference with contractual relations
Conspiracy
 Intimidation
Invasion of privacy
Negligence
Misrepresentation
 Deceit
 Innocent misrepresentation/negligent advice
Defamation
 Injurious falsehood
Passing off
Trespass
 against the person – assault, battery, and false imprisonment.
 against chattels, (personal property)
 to land
Occupation or possession of land
 Private nuisance;
 Cattle/livestock trespass
 Liability for animals (scienter)

Limitation of actions 
An example of statutory modification of torts is the various Limitation of Actions Acts, which prescribe time limits within which litigation must be commenced, and extinguish the cause of action (the legal basis for the claim) after the period lapses. The rationale of limitation periods was elucidated by McHugh J:

As time goes by, relevant evidence may be lost.
It is oppressive to a defendant to allow an action to be brought long after the circumstances which gave rise to it have passed.
Limitation periods give certainty to people (especially businesses and insurers) in arranging their affairs and provisioning for their liabilities within a definite period.
The public interest requires disputes be settled as quickly as possible.

As a general rule, the limitation period on property damage cases is six years in all jurisdictions; the limitation period on personal injuries is three years in New South Wales, Queensland, South Australia, and Tasmania, and six years in all other jurisdictions; and there are other limits on actions arising from e.g. contracts and building and construction cases.

Elements of various torts

Invasion of privacy 
In the case ABC v Lenah Games Meats in 2001, the High Court left open the possibility for development of a tort of invasion of privacy. The Court stated it did not want to decide the matter at that time and only one member, Justice Callinan, gave any indication such a tort may be acceptable. The Court held that Victoria Park Racing v Taylor did not inhibit the development of privacy law in Australia.

Since ABC v Lenah Game Meats, the question of whether invasion of privacy is a valid cause of action has been entertained in at least two states. The most adventurous decision is arguably that of the District Court of Queensland in Grosse v Purvis, in which Judge Skoien awarded damages for invasion of privacy. Conversely, the existence of the tort was questioned by Justice Gillard of the Supreme Court of Victoria in Giller v Procopets, in which the Court held the law had 'not developed to the point where the law in Australia recognises an action for breach of privacy'

Both cases were settled out of court and, as a result, did not proceed to appeal. Until this tort receives the attention of an Australian appellate court, the precedential value of Grosse and Giller is limited.

The ALRC has recommended the Commonwealth create a private right to sue for a serious invasion of privacy. The ALRC considers that by describing the action as a tort, courts will be encouraged to draw upon established principles of tort law (which it hopes would promote a measure of certainty and consistency to the law). It also considers the enactment of such a cause of action would bring Australia into line with recent common law developments concerning serious invasions of privacy in common law jurisdictions.

Defamation
Since 2005, all Australian states have adopted uniform defamation laws.

There are three elements that must be satisfied in order to establish a claim for defamation.

Firstly, the matter complained must contain a defamatory meaning. This is capable of entailing more than one meaning and can include; an article, advertisement or report communicated via an electronic or hard-written document, a gesture or oral utterance. The matter in question may bear a direct or innuendo meaning. The latter ought to be satisfied by virtue of an objective test. Simply put, what a witness perceived to be true is irrelevant. Instead, liability only extends to defamatory imputations which a reasonable person might draw. Liability will not extend where a defamatory imputation was drawn unreasonably.

A matter will only be actionable on the condition that the defamatory imputation can be established as referring to a particular individual. In the event the plaintiff's name is omitted, reference to the plaintiff's characteristics, address and occupation can be used to bring an action against the defendant. It is a question of fact to determine whether identification has been established. Therefore, it is a question of law 'to decide whether on the evidence an ordinary sensible man could draw an inference that the article referred to the plaintiff'.

Finally, the plaintiff must prove that the matter was published by the defendant or in circumstances in which the defendant was responsible for the publication.

New South Wales: Defamation Act 2005.
 Visscher v Maritime Union of Australia'.

Victoria: Defamation Act 2005.

South Australia: Defamation Act 2005.

Northern Territory: Defamation Act 2006.

Western Australia: Defamation Act 2005.

Tasmania: Defamation Act 2005.

Queensland: Defamation Act 2005.
 Pingel v Toowoomba Newspapers Pty Ltd.

Australian Capital Territory: Civil Law (Wrongs) Act 2002.

One of the major and most discussed changes concerned defences to publication of defamatory statements. After the reforms, defendants can defend a defamation case on the basis of truth alone (i.e. their comments were true). Prior to the legislative changes, a number of states (including New South Wales and Tasmania) required that comments be both true, and in the public interest or public benefit, to be protected.

Other changes created by the new uniform defamation laws include limits on the maximum payout available, limitation periods for defamation, and formal recognition to any apologies made by the wrongful party.

Wrongful life
A wrongful life claim is one in which a child plaintiff brings an action against a doctor who negligently diagnosed the plaintiff's mother. Usually, the doctor failed to diagnose rubella during the first trimester, for which there is no cure and which will inevitably cause profound disabilities in the unborn child. Had the mother been correctly diagnosed, she would have exercised her legal right to abortion.

In May 2006, the majority of the High Court rejected wrongful life, refusing to accept that life can be considered a compensable harm. This means that children who are born disabled as a result of a doctor's (admitted) negligence cannot claim damages. Parents are able to pursue 'wrongful birth' claims if the child (disabled or not) is the outcome of a negligently performed sterilisation procedure. However, since the Civil Liability Act, they cannot recover the costs of raising the child in New South Wales.

 Litigation 
Tort law occupies much of the time of the various Magistrates, Local, District and County Courts and a substantial proportion of the time of the Supreme Courts of each of the states and territories. In addition, there are numerous specialist tribunals dealing with workers' compensation and other cases. Road accident victims are far more likely to make claims and receive tort compensation than any other group This predominance is due not so much to the law of torts, but the fact that liability insurance is compulsory by statute in all Australian states.

 Historical context of legislative reform 

 1900s 
Since the common law evolves slowly, legislative intervention has been necessary to keep torts in pace with social needs. The Workmen's Compensation legislation from 1897 is the most potent example of the necessity of tort reform. The combination of (a) increased risks for workers during industrialisation, and; (b) the refusal by common law courts to place the costs of workplace accidents on employers; forced parliaments to redress the defects and shift the costs of industrial accidents back to employers. Legislation such as the Trade Practices Act 1974'' and the state Fair Trading Acts also impinged upon the traditional tort rules in commercial and property areas.

From the early 1980s legislative intervention attempted to reduce the high volume of litigation involving motor vehicle and industrial accidents. Parallel to the rise of Thatcherism in the United Kingdom, in all Australian states common law torts were significantly modified. Speedy "no fault" compensation was made available to workers and victims of motor vehicle accidents in Tasmania, Victoria and the Northern Territory.

The decline of HIH Insurance, the Ipp Review and beyond
Since 2002 there has been an acceleration of legislative change, driven by a perceived crisis in the price and availability of insurance, which was largely blamed on the law of negligence. The issue became charged politically, reinforced by the direct liability of government and its role as a re-insurer of last resort. New South Wales, the most litigious state, had commenced legislative change prior to 2002. Following the collapse of HIH Insurance and the related escalation in insurance premiums in public liability and medical negligence, the NSW proposals were adopted more widely throughout Australia.

Notes

References

Tuberville v Savage [1669] EWHC KB J25

'Breaking Women's Silence in Law: The Dilemma of the Gendered Nature of Legal Reasoning' Lucinda M. Finley (1989) 64 Notre Dame Law Review 886

Law of Australia
Tort law